The 1884 United States elections were held on November 4, electing the members of the 49th United States Congress. The election took place during the Third Party System.

In the Presidential election, Democratic Governor Grover Cleveland of New York defeated Republican former Secretary of State James G. Blaine. Though Cleveland won the popular vote by less than 1%, he won by a fairly comfortable margin in the electoral college. Cleveland won the South and the critical state of New York, while Blaine took most of the rest of the country. This was the most recent example of an incumbent President being denied nomination by his party for another term, as Blaine defeated President Chester A. Arthur at the 1884 Republican National Convention. Cleveland took the Democratic nomination on the second ballot of the 1884 Democratic National Convention, defeating Delaware Senator Thomas F. Bayard and several other candidates. Cleveland's win made him the first Democratic President to win an election since the 1856 election, although Andrew Johnson served out Lincoln's term from 1865 to 1869.

Republicans picked up several seats in the House, but Democrats continued to command a majority in the chamber. In the Senate, Republicans made moderate gains and established a clear majority. As of 2022, these are the last elections in which the incoming president's party held control of the House of Representatives but not the Senate, as well as the last time a Democratic President didn’t assume office with a government trifecta.

See also
1884 United States presidential election
1884 United States House of Representatives elections
1884–85 United States Senate elections

References

1884 elections in the United States
1884